The Atlin River (Lingít: Áa Tlein Héeni) is a river located in the Atlin/Téix'gi Aan Tlein Provincial Park in British Columbia, Canada. It flows out from Atlin Lake

References

Rivers of British Columbia
Cassiar Land District